The American Architect was a weekly periodical on architecture published between 1876 and 1938. Originally titled The American Architect and Building News, in 1909 the magazine changed its name to The American Architect. In 1921, it changed name again to The American Architect and the Architectural Review, the second part of the name being the serial it absorbed.

The magazine reverted to its original name in 1925, and was published for another thirteen years. Its final edition, volume 152, was published in 1938, when it was absorbed into Architectural Record.

The magazine was originally published by Ticknor and Company Publishers, based on Tremont Street in Boston, Massachusetts. It was later published by Swetland Publishing Company and Standard Publishing Company.

References

External links
"American Architect and Architecture" - US Modernist

Visual arts magazines published in the United States
Annual magazines published in the United States
Architecture magazines
Magazines established in 1876
Magazines disestablished in 1938
Defunct magazines published in the United States
Magazines published in New York City
Magazines published in Boston